"Wolfgang" (stylized in all caps) is a song recorded by South Korean boy band Stray Kids. It was released on May 28, 2021, through Stone Music Entertainment and distributed by Genie Music from the extended play [[Kingdom: Legendary War#Kingdom <Finale: Who Is the King?>|Kingdom <Final: Who Is the King?>]]. Written by the band's producer 3Racha and Versachoi, it featured as a song for the group's final competition of the television program Kingdom: Legendary War.

Background

The pre-listening of "Wolfgang" for the Mnet's television show Kingdom: Legendary War final competition song of 6-team contestants was unveiled after part 2 of the round 3 competition was finished on May 27, 2021. The full song was released on May 28, 12:00 PM (KST), together with other 5 songs from 5 contestants. Stray Kids ends up as a winner of the show.

Later, the song was included on the group's second studio album Noeasy, which was released on August 23. The album version of the song includes member Hyunjin, who was in hiatus for most of the program.

Lyrics and composition

"Wolfgang" was written by the group's producer 3Racha (Bang Chan, Changbin, and Han), and co-composed with Versachoi, in the key of D minor, 162 beats per minute with a running time of 3 minutes and 10 seconds. The title refers to the Austrian composer of the Classical period, Wolfgang Amadeus Mozart. The song describes a wolf pack making music by following Wolfgang and compares the habit of a wolf to hunt for prey in a group to Stray Kids. It was intended to imprint a cohesive and solid appearance and unstoppable will toward the goal.

Commercial performance

On May 30, "Wolfgang" entered the Apple Music's Global Top 100 chart at number 98, becoming Stray Kids' first song entering. Additionally, the group becomes the fourth Korean artist to enter the chart after BTS, Blackpink, and Twice.

In South Korea, "Wolfgang" entered the 22nd week of the Gaon Digital Chart at number 163, becoming the group's first-ever song to appear on the chart. The song also charted at number 13 on the component Download Chart, and number 22 on the BGM Chart. On its 23rd week, it jumped to number 138 on the Digital Chart, number 8 on the Download Chart, and number 5 on the BGM Chart, becoming Stray Kids' highest charts on Gaon's song charts. For the Billboard charts issue date of June 12, 2021, the song also entered at number 53 on the K-pop 100, number 4 on the World Digital Song Sales, and number 109 on the Global Excl. US.

Live performance

The song was performed for the first time on the final episode of Kingdom: Legendary War on June 3, 2021. The stage was decorated with a wolf concept, expressing the characteristics of a group of wolves. The song also performed on Noeasy comeback showcase from the final episode of Kingdom Week <No+>, a television variety show that benefits the winner of Kingdom: Legendary War, along with the lead single "Thunderous", the B-side "The View", and "Grow Up" from the debut EP I Am Not (2018). The group performed "Wolfgang" at 36th Golden Disc Awards on January 8, 2022, alongside "Thunderous", and "Top".

Credits and personnel

Credits adapted from Melon.

Recording and management

Originally published by JYP Publishing (KOMCA)
Recorded at JYPE Studios
Mixed and mix engineered at Chapel Swing Studios, Valley Glen, Los Angeles
Mastered at Sterling Sound, New York City

Personnel

Stray Kids – primary vocals
Bang Chan (3Racha) – background vocals, lyrics, composition, arrangement
Changbin (3Racha) – background vocals, lyrics, composition
Han (3Racha) – background vocals, lyrics, composition
Versachoi – composition, arrangement, all instruments
KayOne Lee – vocals editing
Gu Hye-jin – recording
Tony Maserati - mixing
David K. Younghyun – mix engineering
Chris Gehringer – mastering
Will Quinnell – mastering assistant

Charts

References

2021 songs
Korean-language songs
Stray Kids songs